John Edward Peck (born October 10, 1958) is an American television and film actor. His roles include Cole Howard on The Young and the Restless and Jake Martin on All My Children. He also appeared as Lance Apollonaire, a student of Diane Chambers in a college course she was teaching in an episode of Cheers.

Early life and education
He lived in Joplin, Missouri during the 1970s and graduated in 1976 from Joplin Parkwood High School, where he was a member of the varsity tennis team. He attended Missouri Southern State University, where he earned a BA in marketing .

Work
Early in his career, Peck guest-starred on a number of television series, including Diagnosis: Murder, Highway to Heaven, Cheers, Murder, She Wrote and Knight Rider. Peck guest-starred in the ABC Family television series Kyle XY as Adam Baylin in the season finale of season one and certain episodes of season two.

Much of Peck's work has been on both daytime and prime time soap operas. He played Cole Howard on The Young and the Restless from 1993 to 1999. He succeeding Michael Lowry in the role of Jake Martin on All My Children, from 2000 to 2003. His other soap credits include Days of Our Lives (1991–1992); Dynasty (1988–1989) and Dallas (1989).

Peck also appeared in the films Dangerously Close, Lambada, To Grandmother's House We Go and Blind Heat, and was one of the hosts of the Miss USA 1998 pageant.

Filmography

References

External links

Jake Martin profile from SoapCentral

1958 births
Living people
People from Lynchburg, Virginia
Male actors from Missouri
Male actors from Virginia
American male film actors
American male soap opera actors
American male television actors
People from Joplin, Missouri
Missouri Southern State University alumni